Ameris Bancorp is a bank holding company headquartered in Atlanta. Through its bank subsidiary, Ameris Bank, the company operates full-service branches in Georgia, Alabama, Florida, North Carolina and South Carolina, and mortgage-only locations in Georgia, Alabama, Florida, North Carolina, South Carolina, Virginia, Maryland, and Tennessee.

History

The company was founded on October 1, 1971 in Moultrie, Georgia as American Banking Company by Eugene M. Vereen, Jr. The bank started with one location and $1 million in capital. Vereen said he "envisioned a bank for the future" that "set out to create a collective mindset that doesn't rely on tired banking norms or cookie-cutter solutions."

In 1980, ABC Holding Company was formed as a parent company to American Banking Company before changing its name to ABC Bancorp in 1986. Sixteen years after its founding, ABC Bancorp became a public company in 1987 via an initial public offering and in 1994 began trading on the Nasdaq. The company changed to its current name of Ameris Bancorp in 2005.

What started as a regional bank in South Georgia began its expansion into neighboring states in 1996 when it branched into Alabama. Four years later, the bank expanded into Florida. In 2006, the bank expanded into South Carolina and into North Carolina in 2020. The bank now maintains 166 full-service branches in those five states combined, with additional mortgage-only locations in Alabama, Georgia, Florida, South Carolina, North Carolina, Virginia, Maryland and Tennessee.

Since 1979, Ameris Bank has successfully completed 35 mergers and acquisitions. That includes the $24.5 million acquisition of Prosperity Banking Company in 2013, the $37.3 million acquisition of Coastal Bankshares in 2014, the $50 million acquisition of Merchants & Southern Banks of Florida in 2015, the $96.4 million acquisition of Jacksonville Bank in 2016, the $169.3 million acquisition of Atlantic Coast Financial in 2018, the $397.1 million acquisition of Hamilton State Bank in 2018 and the $869.3 million acquisition of Fidelity Southern Corporation in 2019.

Between 2009 and 2012, in transactions organized by the Federal Deposit Insurance Corporation, the company acquired American United Bank, United Security Bank, Satilla Community Bank, First Bank of Jacksonville, Darby Bank & Trust, Tifton Banking Company, One Georgia Bank, High Trust Bank, Central Bank of Georgia, and Montgomery Bank & Trust, all of which suffered from bank failure.

Ameris moved its executive team to Jacksonville, Florida in 2016, where they remained for three years before moving to their current headquarters in Atlanta.

PPP Loans

As an SBA-preferred lender, Ameris Bank worked with its commercial customers to provide relief during the 2020-2021 COVID-19 pandemic. The bank originated more than $1.5 billion in Paycheck Protection Program (PPP) loans to more than 14,000 businesses, including intentional outreach to more than 400,000 minority and woman-owned businesses.

Ameris Rebrand

In 2019, the bank rebranded and launched a new logo, complete with its now synonymous lion. The lion is a symbol of Ameris Bank's strength and courage, pride and fierce determination. It represents Ameris taking bold steps and diverging from the pack, seeing past decades of tired banking norms for a better way.

References

External links
 
 

 
1971 establishments in Georgia (U.S. state)
Banks established in 1971
1980s initial public offerings
Companies based in Atlanta
Banks based in Jacksonville, Florida
Companies listed on the Nasdaq
Southbank, Jacksonville